The 5th Canadian Film Awards were presented on April 30, 1953 to honour achievements in Canadian film. The ceremony was hosted by Jacques DesBaillets with Special Guest Dorothy Lamour.

Winners

Film of the Year: Tit-Coq — Les Productions Gratien Gélinas, Gratien Gélinas producer, René Delacroix and Gratien Gélinas directors
Theatrical Feature Length: Tit-Coq — Les Productions Gratien Gélinas, Gratien Gélinas producer, René Delacroix and Gratien Gélinas directors
Theatrical Short: L'Homme aux oiseaux (The Bird Fancier) — National Film Board of Canada, Guy Glover producer, Bernard Devlin, Jean Palardy directors
Honourable Mention: Les Îles-de-la-Madeleine — National Film Board of Canada, Bernard Devlin producer, Jean Palardy director
Honourable Mention: Canine Crimebusters — Associated Screen Studios, Bernard Norrish producer, Gordon Sparling director
Honourable Mention: Citizen Varek — National Film Board of Canada, Nicholas Balla producer, Gordon Burwash director
Honourable Mention: The Roaring Game — Associated Screen Studios, Bernard Norrish producer, Gordon Sparling director
Non-Theatrical, Open: Angotee: Story of an Eskimo Boy — National Film Board of Canada, Michael Spencer producer, Douglas Wilkinson director
Special Awards: 
L'Âge du castor (Age of the Beaver) — National Film Board of Canada, Tom Daly producer, Colin Low director
Neighbours — National Film Board of Canada, Norman McLaren producer and director
Birds That Eat Flesh — Crawley Films, Quentin Brown producer
A Phantasy — National Film Board of Canada, Norman McLaren producer and director
Honourable Mention: The Son — National Film Board of Canada, Michael Spencer producer, Julian Biggs director
Honourable Mention: The Romance of Transportation in Canada — National Film Board of Canada, Tom Daly producer, Colin Low director
Honourable Mention: The Power Within — Crawley Films, Sally McDonald producer
Honourable Mention: Hot Hickory — Ashley and Crippen Ltd., Dan Gibson producer
Non-Theatrical, Government Sponsored: Shyness — National Film Board of Canada, Tom Daly producer,  Stanley Jackson director
Special Award: Jeunesse rurale — Cine-Photography Branch, Province of Quebec, Abbé Maurice Proulx producer
Honourable Mention: Western Wheat — National Film Board of Canada, Michael Spencer producer, Larry Gosnell director
Honourable Mention: Operation Budworm — Omega Productions, Henri Michaud producer
Non-Theatrical, Non-Government Sponsored: Immediate Action — Crawley Films, George Gorman producer and director
Special Awards:
High Powder — Associated Screen Studios, Jean-Pierre Sénécal producer
Les Bouts d'chou tissent de la laine — Crawley Films
The King's Man — United Church of Canada, Rev. Anson C. Moorehouse producer
Honourable Mention: Calgary Stampede — Chetwynd Films, Arthur Chetwynd producer
Honourable Mention: Rogerstone — Crawley Films
Amateur: Not awarded
Honourable Mention: Magic of the Tropics — Dr. S. Copeland
Honourable Mention: Experiment in Animation — Michael A. Riche

References

Canadian
05
1953 in Canada